Southern Asia may refer to:

 South Asia, a geopolitical macroregion of SAARC countries
 Southern Asia, a geographical subregion in Asia spanning the Iranian Plateau and the Indian subcontinent